Robert Ogden Hunt was a member of the Wisconsin State Assembly.

Biography
Hunt was born on June 27, 1873, in Peshtigo (town), Wisconsin. His parents were David and Augusta Hunt.

Career
Hunt was a member of the Assembly during the 1899 session. He was a Republican.

References

People from Peshtigo, Wisconsin
Republican Party members of the Wisconsin State Assembly
1873 births
Year of death missing